Sangeeta Panwar  (born 29 June 1972), is an Indian television actor, known for her Haryanvi accent. She made her debut with Shashi Sumeet Productions in the television show Kairi — Rishta Khatta Meetha on Colors TV. With the same production house she did Punar Vivah - Ek Nayi Umeed on Zee TV. She gained popularity which took her career onto a different height and got her more shows. In 2014, she played Kashi in the television show Hello Pratibha on Zee TV. During the shoot of the series she was hospitalized. She made her feature film debut in  Sultan, She appeared in Badho Bahu on &TV as Kamla Ahlawat, which has made her more popular.

Television shows

Awards and nominations 
Sangeeta Panwar was nominated as Best Actress in Negative Role for her portrayal in Badho Bahu by Indian Television Academy Awards in 2017.

References

External links

Indian television actresses
Living people
Indian soap opera actresses
1969 births
Actresses in Hindi television
Actresses from Uttar Pradesh
21st-century Indian actresses
People from Moradabad
Actresses from Haryana